Neighbour, Neighbor, Neighbours or Neighbors may refer to:

 Person who lives in one's neighbourhood
 The subject of the Great Commandment

Films
 Neighbors (1920 film), a short film starring Buster Keaton
 Neighbours (1952 film), a 1952 short film by Norman McLaren 
 Neighbours (1966 film), a Danish film
 Neighbors (1971 film), a TV film starring Cicely Tyson
 The Neighbor (1973 film), directed by Luigi Cozzi for a TV show called Door into Darkness
 Neighbors (1981 film), a film based on Berger's novel, starring John Belushi and Dan Aykroyd
 The Neighbor (1993 film), starring Rod Steiger
 The Neighbor (2007 film), starring Matthew Modine and Michèle Laroque
 Neighbor (2009 film), a 2009 horror film written and directed by Robert A. Masciantonio
 Neighbors (2010 film), a film featuring Gil Bellows
 The Neighbor (2012 film), a South Korean film
 Neighbors (2014 American film) (also known as Bad Neighbours), a film starring Seth Rogen and Zac Efron
 Neighbours (2014 Indian film), an Indian horror film
 The Neighbor (2016 film), a thriller co-written and directed by Marcus Dunstan
 The Neighbor (2018 film), a thriller co-written, co-produced and directed by Aaron Harvey and starring William Fichtner

Literature
 My Neighbor, a 1917 short story by Franz Kafka
 Neighbors (novel), a 1980 novel by Thomas Berger
 "Neighbors" (short story), a 1976 short story by Raymond Carver
 Neighbors: The Destruction of the Jewish Community in Jedwabne, Poland, a 2001 book by Jan T. Gross
 The Neighbors (comic strip), a comic strip by George Clark
 The Neighbors, a novel by Ahmad Mahmoud
 The Neighbor, a 2009 novel by Lisa Gardner

Music
 Neighbors (album), a 1988 album by the Reels
 "Neighbours" (Rolling Stones song), 1981
Neighbours (Camouflage song), 1988
 "Neighbors", a song by the Academy Is..., from the album Santi
 "Neighbors" (J. Cole song), 2017
Neighbors (Pooh Shiesty song), 2021
 "Neighbor", a song by Ugly Kid Joe from America's Least Wanted
 "Neighbor", a song by Juicy J featuring Travis Scott
 "The Neighbor" (song), by the Dixie Chicks
 Theme to "Neighbours" (or simply "Neighbours"), from the eponymous Australian soap opera and a 1988 single by Barry Crocker

Television
 Neighbours, an Australian soap opera
 Neighbours: The Music, a 2002 soundtrack album from the show
 The Neighbors (game show), an American game show starring Regis Philbin
 The Neighbors (2012 TV series), an American sci-fi sitcom 
 "Neighbors", an episode of Entourage
 The Neighbors (2015 TV series), a TV series developed by Tommy Wiseau
 The Neighbor (TV series), a 2019 Spanish comedy series

Mathematics
 In graph theory, a neighbor or neighbourhood (graph theory) of a vertex is another vertex that is connected to it by an edge
 Neighbourhood (mathematics), of the basic concepts in a topological space

Other uses
 Neighbor (company), peer-to-peer storage company
 Neighbor Mountain, Virginia
 Nauvoo Neighbor, a weekly newspaper edited and published by Latter Day Saint Apostle John Taylor in Nauvoo, Illinois from 1843 to 1845
 The Neighbor (newspaper), from Indiana
 The Neighbours, sculpture by Siegfried Charoux in London
 Hello Neighbor, video game from Tiny Build
 Hello Neighbor: Hide and Seek, a spin-off of the game by Tiny Build
 Neighbors (app), a neighborhood watch app offered by Amazon and Ring

People with the surname

 Cindy Neighbor (born 1972), former member of the Kansas House of Representatives
 Billy Neighbors (1940–2012), American former football player
 Robert Neighbors (1815–1859), Indian agent and Texas state legislator
 Roy Neighbors (born 1923), American politician
 Neighbour, Australian Aboriginal hero also known as Ayaigar

See also
 Parable of the Good Samaritan, a parable of Jesus that was told in response to the question, "Who is my neighbor?"
 Jim Nabors (1930–2017), American actor
 Neighbors Expedition, led by Robert Neighbors to explore the area between San Antonio and El Paso